Taia may refer to:
Taia (band), a Japanese metal band
Taia (river), a tributary of the Jiul de Est River in Romania.
Tiye or Taia, a queen of Ancient Egypt
Princess Taia of Thebes, a character in Ibis the Invincible
Taia (gastropod), a genus of freshwater snails in the family Viviparidae

People
Abdellah Taïa (born 1973), Moroccan writer
Mapu Taia (born 1939), Cook Islands politician and Speaker of the Cook Islands Parliament
Zeb Taia (born 1984), rugby league player

See also
Taya, a given name and surname
Teia, the last Ostrogothic king in Italy
Thaia (disambiguation)
Tiye (name), Ancient Egyptian name